Küçükçınar is a village in the District of Karaisalı, Adana Province, Turkey. The population in 2009 was 233 people.

References

Villages in Karaisalı District